The United Tajik Opposition (UTO) was an alliance of democratic, nationalist and Islamist forces that officially banded together in 1993, after the most violent phase of the Tajik Civil War. The UTO fought against the pro-communist and Khujandi/Kulyabi government forces led by Emomali Rahmon, then Emomali Rakhmonov.

The UTO opposition consisted of the Islamic Renaissance Party (IRP), Rastokhez (Rebirth), the Democratic Party of Tajikistan (DPT), and Lali Badakhshan (Ruby of Badakshan). The UTO made successful advances against the Rakhmon government, pushing the leader to begin negotiations. In 1997, a peace treaty was concluded between the Rakhmon government and the UTO.

Following the treaty, several units of the Opposition became part of the Tajik National Army, becoming some of its most experienced units.

Political leaders 

 Sayid Abdulloh Nuri (Chairman)
 Haji Akbar Turajanzade
 Mohammadsharif Khimmatzoda
 Davlat Khudonazarov
 Oinikhol Bobonazarova
 Juma Niyazov 
 Abdunabi Sattorzoda
 Otakhon Latifi
 Kiemiddin Goziev 
 Faiziddin Imomov 
 Habibullo Sanginov 
 Abdurakhim Karimov 
 Atobek Amirbekov 
 Muhammadali Faizmuhammad 
 Mansur Jalilzoda
 Mirzomuhammadi Mirzokhodiev

References

Political parties in Tajikistan
1990s in Tajikistan
Nationalist movements in Asia
Defunct political party alliances in Asia